SKTB Katalizator is a special design and technological bureau in Sovetsky District of Novosibirsk, Russia. It was founded in 1970. The company manufactures catalysts, sorbents, catalyst carriers etc.

History
The organization was created in 1970, at the initiative of Georgy Boreskov, director of the Institute of Catalysis of the Siberian Branch of the USSR Academy of Sciences.

Initially, the bureau began its activities on the premises of the Institute of Catalysis. At the same time, a building complex for the organization was under construction (1971–1980). The first buildings of the organization were commissioned in 1973.

Activities
The company develops and manufactures catalysts, catalyst carriers, sorbents and desiccants for oil processing, thermostable catalysts for the dehydrogenation of hydrocarbons in a fluidized bed for the production of synthetic rubber, palladium and vanadium catalysts; dessicants for organic liquids and industrial gases etc.

Locations
The company's plants are located in Shlyuz and ObGES microdistricts of Sovetsky District of Novosibirsk, as well as in Krasnoyarsk Krai and Ryazan Oblast.

Bibliography

References

Manufacturing companies based in Novosibirsk
Sovetsky District, Novosibirsk
Design bureaus
1970 establishments in Russia